Amata mogadorensis  is a species of moth of the family Erebidae first described by Charles Theodore Blachier in 1908. It is found in Morocco and Algeria.

The larvae have been recorded feeding on Sonchus acetosa, Plantago coronopus, Vitis vinifera and Populus nigra.

References 

mogadorensis
Moths described in 1908
Moths of Africa